The Treaty of Blois was signed on 19 April 1572 in Blois between Elizabeth I of England and Catherine de' Medici of France. Based on the terms of the treaty, France and England relinquished their historic rivalry and established an alliance against Spain. The treaty also entailed France to be kept out of Mary, Queen of Scots and Scotland’s affair with England. Elizabeth expected the defensive treaty to isolate Spain and prevent France from invading Flanders.

Sources
Harper, Sally (2005). 'A Dittie to the tune of Welsh Sydannen': a Welsh image of Queen Elizabeth. Renaissance Studies: Volume 19, Issue 2, pp. 201-228.
Martin, Lynn A. (Summer, 1980). Papal Policy and the European Conflict, 1559-1572. Sixteenth Century Journal: Volume 11, No. 2, Catholic Reformation, pp. 35–48.

See also
List of treaties

External links
Treaties
Encyclopædia Britannica - United Kingdom

Blois (1572)
1572 in France
1572 in England
Blois (1572)
1572 treaties
England–France relations